"All Over You" is a song by the rock group Live from their 1994 album, Throwing Copper.

The song was never released as a single in the US, but it reached No. 33 on the Billboard Hot 100 Airplay chart and No. 1 on Billboard's Recurrent Airplay chart. It also charted at No. 4 on the Billboard Modern Rock Tracks and No. 2 on the Mainstream Rock Tracks chart. 

The live B-sides were recorded at the 1995 Glastonbury Festival, with the exception of "Waitress", which was recorded at the Swedish Broadcasting Corporation in Stockholm on June 9, 1995.   "All Over You" appeared in "Syzygy", the episode of The X-Files that aired January 26, 1996.

Composition
The song "All Over You" was composed in the key of C-sharp major with recommended tempo of 126 bpm.

Charts

Weekly charts

Year-end charts

Track listings
All songs written by Live:

Australian and European single
 "All Over You" – 4:01
 "Shit Towne" (Live Version) – 4:34
 "Iris" (Live Version) – 4:04
"All Over You" (Live Version) – 4:14

UK CD single 1  (RAXTD 20)
 "All Over You" – 4:01
 "Shit Towne" (Live Version) – 4:34
"All Over You" (Live Version) – 4:14

UK CD single 2 (RAXXD 20)

UK cassette single
 "All Over You" – 4:01
 "Shit Towne" (Live Version) – 4:28

References 

Live (band) songs
1995 singles
Songs written by Ed Kowalczyk
Song recordings produced by Jerry Harrison
1994 songs
Radioactive Records singles